Ronnie W. Cromer (born December 1, 1947) is a Republican member of the South Carolina Senate, representing the 18th District since 2003, when  he won a special election against Jim Lander to fill the remainder of the term of André Bauer.

References

External links
South Carolina Legislature - Senator Ronnie W. Cromer official SC Senate website
Senator Ronnie Cromer Website Official Campaign Website—News and Information
Project Vote Smart - Senator Ronnie W. Cromer (SC) profile
Follow the Money - Ronnie W. Cromer
2006 2004 campaign contributions

Republican Party South Carolina state senators
1947 births
Living people
21st-century American politicians
People from Newberry, South Carolina